Anastomotic vein may refer to:

 Inferior anastomotic vein, also known as the vein of Labbé
 Superior anastomotic vein, also known as the vein of Trolard